

Hosts

By event

Winter Olympics

1964

1968

1976

1980Boca Raton News - Feb 8, 1980

1984

1988

Summer Olympics

1972

1976

1984

References

ABC Sports
ABC